The Nines is a luxury 5-star hotel in Portland, Oregon. It is a franchise of The Luxury Collection by Marriott International and is owned by Pebblebrook Hotel Trust and managed by Sage Hospitality Resources.

Opened in 2008, the hotel occupies the top nine floors of the Meier & Frank Building, giving the hotel its name. The 331-room hotel includes 32 suites, making it the sixth largest hotel in Portland based on the number of rooms, after Hyatt Regency opened with 600 rooms in 2019.

The hotel has two restaurants: Urban Farmer, a gourmet restaurant on the 8th floor, which is the lobby, that relies on local farmers' produce and Departure Restaurant and Lounge, which serves Asian food and is on the top floor and the roof.

Pebblebrook acquired the hotel in July 2014 for $127 million, or $384,000 per key.

References

External links
 

2008 establishments in Oregon
Skyscraper hotels in Portland, Oregon
Southwest Portland, Oregon
The Luxury Collection